Ahmed Ben Moslah (born 6 January 1995) is a Tunisian para-athlete, who won silver in the shot put F37 event at the 2020 Summer Paralympics.

References

1995 births
Living people
Tunisian male shot putters
Paralympic athletes of Tunisia
Paralympic silver medalists for Tunisia
Athletes (track and field) at the 2020 Summer Paralympics
Medalists at the 2020 Summer Paralympics
Paralympic medalists in athletics (track and field)
21st-century Tunisian people